Novyye Sulli (Yañı Sülle) is a rural locality (a selo) in Starosullinsky Selsoviet, Yermekeyevsky District, Bashkortostan, Russia. The population was 290 as of 2010. There are 2 streets.

Geography 
Novyye Sulli is located 14 km north of Yermekeyevo (the district's administrative centre) by road. Starye Sulli is the nearest rural locality.

References 

Rural localities in Yermekeyevsky District